Ntinos Konstantakis (born 13 April 1986 in Heraklion, Greece) is a Greek football player who played for Olympiakos Chersonissos during the 2008–09 Gamma Ethniki season.

See also
Football in Greece
List of Greece international footballers

References

Association football defenders
Aiolikos F.C. players
Living people
1986 births
Rodos F.C. players
Footballers from Heraklion
Greek footballers